Selkirkshire or the County of Selkirk is a historic county and registration county of Scotland. It borders Peeblesshire to the west, Midlothian to the north, Roxburghshire to the east, and Dumfriesshire to the south. It derives its name from its county town, the royal burgh of Selkirk. The county was historically also known as Ettrick Forest.

Unlike many historic counties, Selkirkshire does not have its own lieutenancy area, but forms part of the Roxburgh, Ettrick and Lauderdale lieutenancy area.

History

In the 1st Century AD Selkirk formed part of the lands of the native people who hunted it rather than settled there. Neither the Romans, Angles, or the Saxons cleared much of the forestry there and for centuries Selkirk was known for its forest coverage. Indeed, an alternative name for the county was Ettrick Forest. Under the Scottish kings the forest was regarded as Royal. Despite this it was not until the reign of James V that sheriffs were appointed to administer the county on the Crown's behalf. During the military occupation of Scotland by Edward I of England, the forest was granted to the Earl of Gloucester.

In the Middle Ages the area that would become Selkirkshire formed part of the province of Tweeddale. The origins of the shire are obscure, but sometime around the twelfth century the area of Tweeddale was divided into two sheriffdoms: Peeblesshire to the north and Selkirkshire or Ettrick Forest to the south. The first recorded sheriff of Selkirkshire was Andrew de Synton, who was appointed by William the Lion (d. 1214). Synton in the parish of Ashkirk, just east of the village centre, was an enclave of Selkirkshire surrounded by Roxburghshire.

Later, the Earl of Pembroke assumed the hereditary sheriffdom. Under and after King Robert the Bruce, the Earls of Douglas, and later Earls of Angus administered the county. In 1501 John Murray (d. 1510), laird of Falahill, was made sheriff of Selkirkshire and on 30 Nov. 1509 he obtained a grant of the hereditary sheriffdom of Selkirkshire. His descendant Sir James Murray was deprived of office in 1681 for being remiss in punishing conventicles, but at the Glorious Revolution was raised to the session bench as Lord Philiphaugh and reinstated as sheriff. His son John Murray (died 1753) was the hereditary Sheriff of Selkirk from 1708 to 1734, when he was returned unopposed as MP for Selkirkshire, having resigned his hereditary sheriffdom to one of his sons. When in 1747 the heritable jurisdictions were abolished, Murray of Philiphaugh received £4,000 in compensation. The Sheriff-Deputes, previously appointed by the hereditary sheriffs, were now appointed by the crown and acted in place of the hereditary sheriffs  One such sheriff of Selkirkshire was Sir Walter Scott who was appointed Sheriff-Depute in 1799, an office he held until his death in 1832.

Selkirkshire County Council was created in 1890 under the Local Government (Scotland) Act 1889, which established elected county councils across Scotland. The 1889 Act also instigated a review of boundaries, particularly where burghs straddled county boundaries. The boundary review for Selkirkshire concluded in 1891 and made a number of mostly minor changes. The most significant change was that the burgh of Galashiels was brought entirely within Selkirkshire, where it had previously been partly in Roxburghshire. Selkirkshire County Council met at the County Buildings on Ettrick Terrace in Selkirk, which had been built in 1870 as a sheriff court and meeting place for the Commissioners of Supply, the main administrative body for the county prior to the creation of the county council. The council's staff were based at the Bank of Scotland Buildings in the Market Place in Selkirk. 

The county council was abolished in 1975 under the Local Government (Scotland) Act 1973, which reorganised local government in Scotland into upper-tier regions and lower-tier districts. Selkirkshire became part of the Borders region and part of the Ettrick and Lauderdale district.

At the time of the local government reorganisation in 1975, the posts of lord-lieutenant of Selkirkshire and lord-lieutenant of Roxburghshire were both held by John Scott, 9th Duke of Buccleuch. The new district of Ettrick and Lauderdale and the neighbouring district of Roxburgh became nominally separate lieutenancy areas, although the Duke of Buccleuch was appointed to both positions, effectively continuing the pre-1975 arrangement. When local government was reorganised again in 1996, the two lieutenancies were formally united into a single lieutenancy area called Roxburgh, Ettrick and Lauderdale.

Folk ballads written of the county commemorate the Battle of Philiphaugh in 1645, the 'Dowie Dens' at Yarrow and Tibbie Shiels at St Mary's Loch.

Geography

Selkirkshire is a rural county, with a handful of small settlements set within hill and forest country. It forms part of the Southern Uplands geographical region. The Ettrick Water and Yarrow Water, both tributaries of the river Tweed, flow through the county. The most prominent loch is St Mary's Loch (including the Loch of the Lowes), with smaller lochs being found east of this such as Akermoor Loch, Shaws Under Loch, Shaws Upper Loch, Halemoor Loch, Alemoor Reservoir, Clearburn Loch, Kingside Loch, Crooked Loch and Windylaw Loch.

Ettrick Forest
Ettrick Forest, also known as Selkirk and Traquair Forests, is a former royal forest in the Scottish Borders area of Scotland. It is a large area of moorland, south of Peebles, that once stretched from Ayr to Selkirk.

Keepers of the Forest
 Simon Fraser of Oliver (d. 1291)
 William Comyn of Kirkintilloch (d. 1291)
 Thomas de Burnham
Simon Fraser (1299–1306)

Transport
The Borders Railway connects Galashiels and Tweedbank with Edinburgh. Closed for many years, this line re-opened in 2015.
There are also buses to Berwick-Upon-Tweed and Carlisle operated by Borders Buses.

Civil parishes and population 
Selkirkshire was historically divided into civil parishes. There were originally nine parishes; Ashkirk, Bowside, Buccleuch (or Rankilburn), Duchoire, Ettrick, Kirkhope, Lindean, St Mary's (or St Mary of the Lowes) and Selkirk. There have been a number of changes since the medieval period:

 Caddonfoot was created in 1898 from the part of the parish of Stow of Wedale that lay within Selkirkshire.
 Galashiels was formed by the union of two ancient parishes, Bowside and Lindean.
 The parish of Rankilburn or Buccleuch was suppressed and united to Yarrow c. 1600, then transferred to Ettrick 1650.
 The ancient parishes of Duchoire, St Mary's and Kirkhope were united to form the parish of Yarrow; Kirkhope was then separated from Yarrow in 1852.

Population of the county by Civil Parish, according to the latest census (2011):

The population of the towns in the county (in 2011):
Galashiels - 14,994 (of which 12,893 in Selkirkshire) 
Selkirk - 5,784

Historical population of the county as returned by the census was as follows:
1801: 5,889
1811: 6,637
1821: 6,833
1841: 7,990
1851: 9,809
1861: 10,449
1871: 19,651
1881: 26,346
1891: 28,068
1901: 23,356
1911: 24,601
1921: 22,607
1931: 22,711
1951: 21,729
1961: 21,055
1971: 20,868 
1991: 17,456
2001: 17,757
2011: 18,267

Settlements

Boleside
Bowhill
Broadmeadows
Caddonfoot
Clovenfords
Ettrick
Ettrickbridge
Galashiels (partly in Roxburghshire prior to 1891)
Philiphaugh
Roberton
Selkirk
Yarrow
Yarrowford

See also
James Hogg
List of places in the Scottish Borders
List of places in Scotland
Craik Forest
Wauchope Forest
List of forests in the United Kingdom

References

Further reading
The archeology and historic buildings of the county were documented in 1957 by the Royal Commission on the Ancient and Historical Monuments in Scotland.
There is also a History of Selkirkshire by T. Craig Brown, published in 1886.

External links

"Selkirkshire" from A Topographical Dictionary of Scotland by Samuel Lewis, 1846 (British History Online)
Entries on Selkirkshire from the Ordnance Gazetteer of Scotland by Frances Groome(1882-4) and the Gazetteer of the British Isles by John Bartholomew (1887) (Vision of Britain)
EttrickForestArchers.co.uk
RCAHMS record for Ettrick Forest or Selkirkshire
SCRAN: Bowling champions in front of club house at Ettrick Forest Bowling Club, Selkirk
The Borders Forest Trust
Gazetteer for Scotland; Ettrick Forest
Jstor: A newly discovered map of Ettrick Forest by Robert Gordon of Straloch
The Ettrick Forest Tartan
James Hogg, the Ettrick Shepherd

 
Former counties of Scotland
Forests and woodlands of Scotland
History of the Scottish Borders
Geography of the Scottish Borders
Counties of the United Kingdom (1801–1922)